Supremacy MMA is a mixed martial arts–style fighting video game developed by Kung Fu Factory and published by 505 Games. The game was released on September 20, 2011 in North America, September 23 in Europe, and September 29 in Australia for the PlayStation 3 and Xbox 360 game consoles. It was also ported to the PlayStation Vita on March 27, 2012 in North America, and May 11 in Europe, under the title Supremacy MMA: Unrestricted, with several exclusive venues, 2 exclusive fighters and both of the Pre-order DLC fighters.

Gameplay
The game takes players through an underground amateur mixed martial arts circuit as their character attempts to achieve fame within the game. GameZone contrasted this competition style to that of other MMA titles such as UFC Undisputed 2010 or EA Sports MMA which it said, "take a professional, technical approach to mixed martial arts".

As a fight progresses, competitors faces can become swollen and bruised after being punched repeatedly, and blood from the fighters begins to coat the ground. IGN reviewer Greg Miller stated that he gasped when witnessing one of the knockout animations.

Roster

Supremacy MMA is the first mixed martial arts video game to allow players to fight using female fighters. The two female fighters in the game are based on the real life MMA fighters Felice Herrig and Michele Guitierrez.

The full roster includes the following fighters and their respective real world inspirations:

St. John Ackland (Devon Schwan) – Submission Wrestling
Dante Algearey (Jason Yorrick) – Kickboxing
Pre-order DLC/PS VITA: Shane del Rosario (Shane del Rosario) – MMA
Michele Guitierrez (Michele Gutierrez) – Kickboxing
Yuki Hashimoto (Steve Kim) – Karate
Tomo Hashimoto (Fernando Chien) – Judo
Felice Herrig (Felice Herrig) – Muay Thai
Ilya Klimenko (Nikolai Ruabtsev) – Wrestling
Jerome Le Banner (Jerome Le Banner) – Kickboxing
Unlockable: Pierre Matiss (Joe Schilling) – Savate
Unlockable: Mariano Mendoza (Mariano Mendoza) – Boxing
Jens Pulver (Jens Pulver) – Boxing
Pre-order DLC/PS VITA: Bao Quach (Bao Quach) – Karate
Demian Reis (Giva Santana) – Brazilian Jiu Jitsu
Jack Saxon (Brent Cooper) – MMA
Malaipet Sitarvut (Malaipet) – Muay Thai
PS VITA Exclusive: Jason Yee (Jason Yee) – Jeet Kune Do
PS VITA Exclusive: Novell Bell (Novell Bell) – San Shao/Kung Fu

Development
Supremacy MMA was announced on June 11, 2010, and the publishers stated it would be shown that year at E3 2010. The game was originally slated for a June 2011 release, but was not released until September 2011.

Reception

The game received generally negative reviews upon release with review aggregator Metacritic rating the Xbox 360 version with a score of 47 out of 100 and the PlayStation 3 version a score of 48 out of 100. Greg Miller of IGN criticized the game stating that it suffered from animations which appear stiff, poor quality voice acting, and latency issues during online play, although he noted that even worse than these problems was the game's poor controls. While performing his review of the game, Greg Miller created a preview video showing the choppy animations, unresponsive controls, and echoing sound effects present during online matches, concluding the video stating, "I don't like this game very much." GamePro appreciated the similarity between the fighters' depictions and their real life counterparts, but criticized the fighting system, musical soundtrack, and gratuitous violence particularly during the Mortal Kombat–style finishing moves, which often result in broken limbs or necks and do not follow the style of typical MMA fighting.

References

2011 video games
Mixed martial arts video games
PlayStation 3 games
PlayStation Vita games
Video games developed in the United States
Xbox 360 games
Multiplayer and single-player video games
505 Games games
Kung Fu Factory games